The Canal d'Arles à Fos (also: Canal d'Arles à Bouc) is a canal in southern France. It connects the Rhône near Arles with Fos-sur-Mer.

The Langlois Bridge painted by Vincent van Gogh in 1888 was one of the drawbridges across the canal.

See also
 List of canals in France
 Canal de Craponne

References

External links
 Lucien Rimeur, "Notes sur le Canal d'Arles à Bouc", in Bulletin des Amis du Vieil Arles, n° 43 et 44, December 1981, March 1982 

Arles
Buildings and structures in Bouches-du-Rhône
Transport in Provence-Alpes-Côte d'Azur
Canals opened in 1830
1830 establishments in France